A total solar eclipse will occur on December 27, 2084. A solar eclipse occurs when the Moon passes between Earth and the Sun, thereby totally or partly obscuring the image of the Sun for a viewer on Earth. A total solar eclipse occurs when the Moon's apparent diameter is larger than the Sun's, blocking all direct sunlight, turning day into darkness. Totality occurs in a narrow path across Earth's surface, with the partial solar eclipse visible over a surrounding region thousands of kilometres wide.

Related eclipses

Solar eclipses 2083–2087

Saros 133

Notes

References 

2084 12 27
2084 12 27
2084 12 27
2084 in science